Rogue of the Rio Grande is a 1930 American musical comedy Western film directed by Spencer Gordon Bennet and starring José Bohr, Myrna Loy and Walter Miller.

Main cast
 José Bohr as El Malo 
 Myrna Loy as Carmita 
 Walter Miller as Sheriff Tex Rankin 
 Carmelita Geraghty as Dolores 
 Gene Morgan as Mayor Seth Landport 
 Raymond Hatton as Pedro 
 William P. Burt as Carmita's Dance Partner 
 Florence Dudley as Big Bertha

Plot
El Malo robs the mayor of a town (who is actually an outlaw) to help poor people and falls in love with Carmita, the entertainer at an inn. After capturing the mayor following a stage robbery, El Malo reveals that he is the Robin Hood-type robber, leading to his own arrest and the hatred of Carmita. A friend finally helps El Malo escape, and he takes Carmita with him.

Reception 
A review in Harrison's Reports described the film as "Just an ordinary western, with little to hold the interest." It added, "It cannot rate as anything higher than ordinary."

References

Bibliography
 Pitts, Michael R. Poverty Row Studios, 1929–1940: An Illustrated History of 55 Independent Film Companies, with a Filmography for Each. McFarland & Company, 2005.

External links
 

1930 films
1930s Western (genre) comedy films
1930s English-language films
American Western (genre) comedy films
Films directed by Spencer Gordon Bennet
American musical comedy films
1930 musical comedy films
American black-and-white films
1930s Western (genre) musical films
American Western (genre) musical films
1930s American films